

History 
The station opened on 1 June 1865 by the Llanelly Railway. It was situated on the north side of the line west of the level crossing. There was a siding and a small goods yard east of the level crossing. The station closed along with the line on 6 September 1963. A few station buildings, the platform and one of the level crossing gates survive.

References

External links 

Disused railway stations in Carmarthenshire
Former London and North Western Railway stations
Railway stations in Great Britain opened in 1865
Railway stations in Great Britain closed in 1963
1865 establishments in Wales